Île-des-Soeurs is an unopened Réseau express métropolitain (REM) station on Nuns' Island in Montreal's borough of Verdun. It is operated by CDPQ Infra and serves as a station on the South Shore branch of the REM.

It is located between the headquarters of Bell Canada (to the north) and the Place du Commerce shopping centre (to the south) atop the Highway 10/A 15.

References

Railway stations in Montreal
Réseau express métropolitain railway stations
Verdun, Quebec
Railway stations scheduled to open in 2023